Thatta is a small town and Union Council of Attock District in the Punjab province of Pakistan. The Khattar family of this village were of historical importance.

References

Cities and towns in Attock District